Tenellia leopardina is a species of sea slug, an aeolid nudibranch, a marine gastropod mollusc in the family Fionidae.

Distribution
This species was described from Marseille, France. In the original description it was also reported from the Rade de Villefranche-sur-Mer, Genoa, Italy, and near Trieste.

Description 
The typical adult size of this species is 10 mm.

References 

Fionidae
Gastropods described in 1888